Roland GS, or just GS, sometimes expanded as General Standard or General Sound, is a MIDI specification. It requires that all GS-compatible equipment must meet a certain set of features and it documents interpretations of some MIDI commands and bytes sequences, thus defining instrument tones, controllers for sound effects, etc.

In addition to the simpler General MIDI standard, GS defines 98 additional tone instruments, 15 more percussion instruments, 8 more drum kits, 3 effects (reverb/chorus/variation) and some other features.

The Roland SC-55 was the first synthesizer to support the GS standard.

History 
The GS extensions were first introduced and implemented on Roland Sound Canvas series modules, starting with the Roland SC-55 in 1991. The first model supported 317 instruments, 16 simultaneous melodic voices, 8 percussion voices and a compatibility mode for Roland MT-32 (although it only emulated it and lacked programmability of original MT-32) and gained explosive popularity.

In addition to the Sound Canvas series, Roland also provided GS compatibility in its own professional lineup through the JV-30 keyboard and the VE-GS1 expansion board for other JV-series instruments. In addition, GS compatibility is provided in the GM2 specification which Roland helped to create and actively supports.

Some other manufacturers attempted to be compatible to Roland GS, but could not use the GS trademark or samples. In Yamaha XG synthesizers for example the GS implementation was called "TG300B mode". Dream S.A. used unlicensed samples of Roland GS instruments and was sued.

Notable features

Banks 
The program in every individual bank will align with the 128 in GM's instrument patch map.
The Sound Canvas used additional pair of controllers, cc#0 and cc#32, to specify up to 16384 (128*128) 'variations' of each melodic sound defined by General MIDI. Typically, cc#32 (Bank Select LSB) was used to select a family (i.e. 1 - SC-55, 2 - SC-88 etc.) then cc#0 (Bank Select MSB) was used to set a particular variation bank.

Drum kits 
MIDI channel 10 is used for drums by default like in General MIDI, but they are accessible on any channel through the use of SysEx. Only 2 different drum kits can be used at a time. There are 15 different kits in total:

 1    Standard Kit
 9    Room Kit
 17   Power Kit
 25   Electronic Kit
 26   TR-808 Kit
 33   Jazz Kit
 41   Brush Kit
 49   Orchestra Kit
 57   SFX Kit
 128  CM-64/CM-32L Kit

Additional percussion notes 

There were 16 additional drum notes that span Drum Kits 1 to 49:

 25 Snare Roll
 26 Finger Snap
 27 High Q
 28 Slap
 29 Scratch Push
 30 Scratch Pull
 31 Sticks
 32 Square Click
 33 Metronome Click
 34 Metronome Bell
 82 Shaker
 83 Jingle Bell
 84 Belltree
 85 Castanets
 86 Mute Surdo
 87 Open Surdo

Additional controller events 

Additional controller events included in SC-55 and SC-88 were:

 0   Bank select MSB
 5   Portamento time
 32  Bank select LSB
 65  Portamento
 66  Sostenuto
 67  Soft Pedal
 84  Portamento Control
 91  Effect 1 (Reverb) Send Level
 93  Effect 3 (Chorus) Send Level
 94  Effect 4 (Delay) Send Level
 98  NRPN LSB
 99  NRPN MSB
 120 All Sounds Off
 121 Reset all controllers
 123 All notes off

SysEx messages 

There were messages that allowed the user to turn the GS mode on/off, to set effects processor parameters, to change EG envelopes etc.

Supporting hardware 

Beginning in 1991, Roland introduced GS support in the majority of its consumer MIDI products.

Tone generator modules 

 FG-10
 M-GS64
 RA-90
 SC-50
 SC-55
 SC-55mkII
 SC-33
 SC-155
 SC-55ST
 SC-55ST-WH
 SC-55K
 CM-300
 CM-500
 SC-88
 SC-88VL
 SC-88ST
 SC-88Pro
 SC-88STPro
 SC-880
 SC-8850
 SC-8820
 SC-D70
 SD-90
 SD-80
 SD-50
 SD-35
 SD-20
 DS-330 (Boss)
 Yamaha MU1000EX
 Yamaha MU2000EX

Synthesizers and electronic keyboards 
 E-15 / E-35 / E-36 / E-56 / E-70 / E-86
 JV-30 / JV-35 / JV-50
 JW-50
 SK-50 / SK-50IV / SK-88 Pro
 XP-10

Sequencers 
 SD-35 
 PMA-5
 MC-80EX (VE-GS PRO expansion board; SC-55, SC-88, SC-88 PRO maps)

See also 
 Comparison of MIDI standards

References 

MIDI standards
Japanese inventions